Catamacta is a genus of moths belonging to the subfamily Tortricinae of the family Tortricidae.

Species
Catamacta alopecana (Meyrick, 1885)
Catamacta gavisana (Walker, 1863)
Catamacta lotinana (Meyrick, 1883)
Catamacta rureana (Felder & Rogenhofer, 1875)
Catamacta scrutatrix Meyrick, 1912

Former species
Catamacta imbriculata Meyrick, 1938
Catamacta manticopa Meyrick, 1934

See also
List of Tortricidae genera

References

 , 1911, Trans. New Zealand Inst. 43: 81. 
 , 2005, World Catalogue of Insects 5.

External links
 tortricidae.com

Archipini
Tortricidae genera
Taxa named by Edward Meyrick